Matteo Berrettini defeated Andy Murray in the final, 6–4, 5–7, 6–3 to win the singles tennis title at the 2022 Stuttgart Open.

Marin Čilić was the defending champion, but chose not to participate.

Seeds
The top four seeds receive a bye into the second round.

Draw

Finals

Top half

Bottom half

Qualifying

Seeds

Qualifiers

Draw

First qualifier

Second qualifier

Third qualifier

Fourth qualifier

References

External links
Main draw
Qualifying draw

Stuttgart Open - Singles
2022 Singles